Claudio Ambu (born 2 August 1958) is an Italian former professional footballer who played for Inter Milan, Ascoli, Perugia, Lazio, Monza, Genoa, Frosinone and Viareggio.

External links
Player profile at FootballPlus.com 

1958 births
Living people
Italian footballers
Italy under-21 international footballers
Serie A players
Serie B players
Inter Milan players
Ascoli Calcio 1898 F.C. players
A.C. Perugia Calcio players
S.S. Lazio players
A.C. Monza players
Genoa C.F.C. players
Frosinone Calcio players
Footballers from Milan
Association football forwards